The Fundy Shore Scenic Drive is a scenic drive in the Canadian province of Nova Scotia. It located along the northeastern portion of the Bay of Fundy, following the Chignecto Peninsula which separates Chignecto Bay and Minas Basin, an area which contains the highest tidal range on the planet.

The Fundy Shore Scenic Drive runs from Upper Nappan, just south of Amherst, to Parrsboro and is entirely in Cumberland County. Some older maps show the route as being an alternate route of the Glooscap Trail.

Communities
Amherst
Nappan
Maccan
River Hebert
Joggins
Advocate Harbour
Port Greville
Parrsboro

Parks
Cape Chignecto Provincial Park
Rave Head Wilderness Area

Museums
Fundy Geological Museum
Age of Sail Heritage Centre
Joggins Fossil Cliffs

Highways
Route 209
Route 242
Route 302

References

Roads in Cumberland County, Nova Scotia
Tourist attractions in Cumberland County, Nova Scotia